The effects of Hurricane Floyd in Pennsylvania were concentrated in southeastern portions of the state, and included over a dozen deaths. Hurricane Floyd made landfall in North Carolina and, in a weakened state, impacted the Mid-Atlantic States with torrential rainfall. Over  of rain in the state caused extensive and damaging flash flooding that affected over 10,000 homes. Many people became stranded due to the flood waters, and thousands had to be evacuated. Relatively strong winds resulted in widespread downed trees, some of which landed on houses and vehicles. Total preliminary damage from the storm was $60 million, and it is estimated that 13 people died due to the storm. Following the floods, multiple counties were declared major disaster areas.

Background and preparations

The system moved west-northwestward, and intensified into a tropical storm on September 8. Continuing to intensify, Floyd attained hurricane strength on September 10. The hurricane ultimately peaked as a Category 4 hurricane on the Saffir–Simpson Hurricane Scale as it struck the Bahamas. The storm turned northwestward and soon northward, brushing the coast of Florida and the southeast United States. On September 16, Floyd made landfall as a Category 2 hurricane in North Carolina, and moved northeastward along the Eastern Seaboard. It passed through the Mid-Atlantic States as it deteriorated into a tropical storm, and lost its tropical identity over southern Maine.

Ahead of the storm, officials in Pennsylvania hoped rainfall from Hurricane Floyd would relieve persistent drought conditions, although on September 15 a spokesperson for the Department of Environmental Protection advised that the storm's path was still uncertain. Then-governor Tom Ridge activated the state Emergency Operations Center in anticipation of flooding rains. Advisories for high winds and potential flooding were issued throughout the state, and a state of emergency was declared in eastern Pennsylvania.

Impact
The  of precipitation at Philadelphia International Airport set a new daily rainfall record and an overall 24-hour record. Rain from the storm exceeded 100-year levels along the axis of the most severe downpours. A cold front that stalled on September 15 acted as a conveyor belt of tropical moisture, which reached the area early that same day. The rainfall had abated by the afternoon on September 16. Winds were generally below , although a gust to  occurred at the Commodore Barry Bridge.

Despite low stream flow due to the preceding drought, the heavy rainfall caused severe flooding. The two hardest-hit counties were Delaware and Bucks, where 7,000 people evacuated from their homes. More than 10,000 homes were flooded, of which 1,000 sustained damage and 200 were damaged to the point of being uninhabitable. The flooding forced the closure of hundreds of roads and bridges throughout the area, and total monetary damage to infrastructure was estimated at $20 million. Runoff inundated sewage treatments plants, causing raw sewage to empty into rivers. Many creeks swelled to record levels, in some cases over double their estimated flood stage, and surpassed their banks. Flooding was particularly extensive along the Neshaminy Creek, and in Middletown Township a home was washed  from its foundation.

Despite barricades, many cars became stranded in the flood waters. Motorists were rescued from the roofs of their vehicles. In Buckingham Township, a bus with 11 students was stranded in a creek, with all of its occupants rescued. According to a damage report by the National Climatic Data Center, the borough of Darby in Delaware County was "cut off and decimated" by floods from the Darby and Cobb creeks. In Conshohocken, a rail car carrying 10 people became trapped in rapidly rising flood waters. After a rescue boat capsized en route, a few of the passengers held onto a tree awaiting rescue. Tides along the Delaware River caused moderate flooding of low-lying land.

In the Philadelphia area, 3,500 homes were flooded and 1,000 residents were evacuated. Around 400 people became stranded at the Radisson Hotel. Although wind gusts were below hurricane-force in Pennsylvania, saturated ground from the torrential precipitation resulted in widespread downed trees, some of which struck houses and vehicles. Gibson's Covered Bridge sustained severe damage due to fallen trees. Over 500,000 homes and businesses lost power as a result of Tropical Storm Floyd. On the Rockville Bridge, which spans the Susquehanna River, high winds tipped over some cars of a freight train.

An estimated total of 13 people died either directly or indirectly as a result of the storm. About 40 others were severely injured. The fatalities were largely due to drownings, fallen trees, or heart attacks from physical strain. Total storm-related damage was preliminarily estimated at $60 million, and the storm left over 4,000 residents homeless.

Aftermath
On September 18, then-President Bill Clinton declared Bucks, Chester, Delaware, Lancaster, Montgomery, Philadelphia and York counties as major disaster areas, and an additional county, Berks, was included the next month. The deadline for storm victims to apply for state and federal aid was set for November 17. In total, 16,442 applications were received, and by November 19, $26.6 million in aid had been provided. Catholic Charities provided additional assistance to North Carolina, Pennsylvania and New Jersey. Due to the overall destruction along the hurricane's path, the name "Floyd" was retired following its usage, and will never be used again for a hurricane in the Atlantic.

See also

List of Pennsylvania hurricanes
Effects of Hurricane Floyd in New York

References

External links
Floyd Tropical Cyclone Report 

Floyd
Pennsylvania
1999 in sports in Pennsylvania
Floods in Pennsylvania
Floyd in Pennsylvania